The 2021 Tour de Suisse was a road cycling stage race that took place between 6 and 13 June 2021 in Switzerland. It was the 84th edition of the Tour de Suisse and the 20th event of the 2021 UCI World Tour.

Teams 
All nineteen UCI WorldTeams are joined by three UCI ProTeams and the Swiss national team to make up the twenty-three teams that are participating in the race. Each team entered a squad of seven riders, for a total of 161 riders who started the race. Before Stage 4,  pulled out of the race after a staff member tested positive for COVID-19. 124 riders finished the race.

UCI WorldTeams

 
 
 
 
 
 
 
 
 
 
 
 
 
 
 
 
 
 
 

UCI ProTeams

 
 
 

National Teams

 Switzerland

Route 
The 2021 route largely replicates that which was initially planned for the 2020 edition, which was cancelled due to the COVID-19 pandemic.

Stages

Stage 1 
6 June 2021 — Frauenfeld to Frauenfeld,  (ITT)

Stage 2 
7 June 2021 — Neuhausen to Lachen,

Stage 3 
8 June 2021 — Lachen to Pfaffnau,

Stage 4 
9 June 2021 — St. Urban to Gstaad, 

Before the stage,  pulled out of the race after a staff member tested positive for COVID-19.

Stage 5 
10 June 2021 — Gstaad to Leukerbad, 

After the stage, race commissaires handed Julian Alaphilippe a 20-second penalty and a 200CHF fine for taking an illegal feed inside the last  of the stage.

Stage 6 
11 June 2021 — Fiesch to Disentis-Sedrun, 

Originally, Rui Costa narrowly beat Andreas Kron in a two-up sprint. However, after the stage, race commissaires relegated Costa for having deviated from his sprinting line and thus impeding Kron's sprint.

Stage 7 
12 June 2021 — Disentis-Sedrun to Andermatt,  (ITT)

Stage 8 
13 June 2021 — Andermatt to Andermatt,

Classification leadership table 

 On stage 2, Mattia Cattaneo, who was third in the points classification, wore the black jersey, because first placed Stefan Küng wore the yellow jersey as the leader of the general classification and second placed Stefan Bissegger wore the white jersey as the leader of the young rider classification.
 On stage 3, Mathieu van der Poel, who was second in the points classification, wore the black jersey, because first placed Stefan Küng wore the yellow jersey as the leader of the general classification.
 On stage 4, Stefan Küng, who was second in the points classification, wore the black jersey, because first placed Mathieu van der Poel wore the yellow jersey as the leader of the general classification. For the same reason, Stefan Bissegger wore the black jersey on stage 5.
 Before stage 6, Mathieu van der Poel, who was leading the points classification, and Lucas Hamilton, who was leading the young rider classification, both abandoned the race due to illness. As a result, on stage 6, Stefan Bissegger, who was second in the points classification, wore the black jersey, while Eddie Dunbar, who was second in the young rider classification, wore the white jersey.

Final classification standings

General classification

Points classification

Mountains classification

Young rider classification

Team classification

Notes

References 

2021
Tour de Suisse
Tour de Suisse
Tour de Suisse